John Warfield may refer to:
 John N. Warfield, American systems scientist
 John Mortimer Warfield, Royal Air Force officer